Listen is a 1996 American mystery thriller film directed by Gavin Wilding, starring Brooke Langton, Sarah G. Buxton, Gordon Currie, Andy Romano, J. H. Wyman.

Cast
 Brooke Langton as Sarah Ross
 Sarah G. Buxton as Krista Baron
 Gordon Currie as Jake Taft
 Andy Romano as Detective Sam Steinmann
 J. H. Wyman as Randy Wilkes
 Evan Tylor as Detective Louis Penny
 Jeff Burnett as Curtis Farley
 Philip Granger as Max
 Iris Quinn as Farley's Sister
 Sherry Thoreson as Lisa

Reception
Kevin Thomas of the Los Angeles Times wrote while Buxton and Langton are "poised", and Wilding's direction is "earnest", Quastel and Bafaro's screenplay is "ludicrous and exploitative of violence against women".

Leonard Klady of Variety called the film "stylish" but "extremely empty-headed".

TV Guide called the film "glossy" but "witless".

References

External links
 
 

American mystery thriller films
1990s mystery thriller films